Pier 13 is a 1940 American mystery film directed by Eugene Forde and starring Lynn Bari, Lloyd Nolan and Joan Valerie. It is a remake of the 1932 film Me and My Gal with Spencer Tracy and Joan Bennett in which a waterfront cop meets an attractive waitress whose sister turns out to be romantically involved with the criminal he is pursuing. The film's sets were designed by the art directors Lewis H. Creber and Richard Day.

Partial cast
 Lynn Bari as Sally Kelly  
 Lloyd Nolan as Danny Dolan  
 Joan Valerie as Helen Kelly  
 Douglas Fowley as Johnnie Hale  
 Chick Chandler as Nickie 
 Oscar O'Shea as Skipper Kelly  
 Adrian Morris as Al Higgins  
 Louis Jean Heydt as Bill Hamilton 
 Frank Orth as Dead Pan Charlie  
 Stanley Blystone as Policeman 
 Charles D. Brown as Captain Blake 
 Maurice Cass as Howard 
 Frank Darien as Old Man in Car 
 Hal K. Dawson as Ticket Salesman  
 Edward Earle as Peters  
 Sherry Hall as Clerk  
 Hamilton MacFadden as Reporter  
 Kitty McHugh as Mary  
 Mantan Moreland as Sam  
 Don Rowan as Husky Man  
 Hector V. Sarno as Italian  
 Florence Shirley as Mrs. Forrest 
 Harry Strang as Pier Official  
 Ben Taggart as Detective  
 Phil Tead as Photographer  
 Harry Tyler as Alibi Joe  
 Max Wagner as Tramp 
 Fred Walburn as Shorty  
 Jack Woody as Steward

References

Bibliography
 Michael Schlossheimer. Gunmen and Gangsters: Profiles of Nine Actors Who Portrayed Memorable Screen Tough Guys. McFarland, 2001.

External links
 

1940 films
1940 mystery films
1940s English-language films
American mystery films
Films directed by Eugene Forde
20th Century Fox films
Remakes of American films
American black-and-white films
1940s American films